Terrance Hinds (born 1992) is a Trinidadian cricketer. He made his Twenty20 debut for Trinbago Knight Riders in the 2018 Caribbean Premier League on 7 September 2018. He made his first-class debut on 9 January 2020, for Trinidad and Tobago in the first round of the 2019–20 West Indies Championship. In the next round of matches, he scored his maiden century in first-class cricket, with an unbeaten 102 runs.

In May 2022, in round four of the 2021–22 West Indies Championship, Hinds took his maiden five-wicket haul in first-class cricket, with 5/32 against Barbados.

References

External links
 

1992 births
Living people
Trinidad and Tobago cricketers
Trinbago Knight Riders cricketers
Place of birth missing (living people)